Governed by Cycling Canada, the Canadian National Time Trial Championship is a road bicycle race that takes place inside the Canadian National Cycling Championship, and decides the best cyclist in this type of race. Svein Tuft is the all-time Canadian record holder for the most wins in the event with 11 wins. The women's record is held by Clara Hughes with 5 national titles.

The current elite champions of the race are Derek Gee and Paula Findlay.

Men

Elite

U23

Women

Elite

References

External links
Past winners on cyclingarchives.com

National road cycling championships
Cycle races in Canada
Recurring sporting events established in 1995
1995 establishments in Canada
National championships in Canada